Zhang Xiaofei is a Chinese actress and comedian.

Life
Zhang Xiaofei was born in 1986 in Anshan, Liaoning. In 1997 she studied dancing at Minzu University, and in 2001 she joined a People's Armed Police performance troupe. Four years later, she was accepted to the Beijing Film Academy performance institute. She studied there in the same graduating class as Yang Mi, Yuan Shanshan, Jiao Junyan, and Jing Chao. In 2009 she graduated as a top student in her department and joined China Broadcasting Performing Arts Group, where she studied under comedian Feng Gong and met another protégé of Feng Gong's, Jia Ling. With Jia Ling's help, Zhang Xiaofei gradually became a comedian. In 2016, Jia established Big Bowl Entertainment, and Zhang signed on as its first artist.

Filmography

TV series
2009 – Yangjiao (仰角) – as Liu Lian
2009 – Medal – as Si Meizi
2010 – Gan Si Dui (敢死队) – as Shu Yajie
2011 – Tian Xing Jian (天行健) – as Song Huimin
2012 – Thorn in the Flesh – as Meimei
2012 – Marshal Liu Bocheng – as Zha Xiaoying
2013 – Lie Yan (烈焰) – as Liu Yali
2014 – The Third Way of Love – as Sun Xiaolian (guest)
2014 – Ma Xiangyang Xiaxiang Ji (马向阳下乡记) – as Qi Huai
2016 – What If
2017 – Don't Zhuang B – season 3
2020 – Happy Hunter – as Zhenbao

Film
2006 – Fenghuo Suiyue (烽火岁月) – as Lin Xiaotong
2009 – The Village School's Winter – as Huihui
2010 – Dabing's Shakespeare – as Zhang Ran
2011 – The Space Dream – as Zhou Xiaosu
2016 – Pili Family – as Mili
2018 – Happiness Is Coming – as Lulu
2019 – A Fantastic Encounter – as Cunhua
2020 – Electromagnetic King Pili Family – as Mili
2021 – Hi, Mom – as Li Huanying
2023 – Five Hundred Miles – as Jin Hao

Variety shows
2014 – Yiqi Lai Xiao Ba (一起来笑吧)
2015 – Xiju Ban de Chuntian (喜剧班的春天) – season 1
2015 – Top Funny Comedian – season 1
2016 – Top Funny Comedian – season 2
2016 – Comedy General Mobilization – season 1
2016 – Golden Night – season 1
2017 – Top Funny Comedian – season 3
2017 – Xianchu Dangdao (鲜厨当道)
2017 – Happy Theater – season 1
2018 – I Am the Actor
2017 – Happy Theater – season 2

She also performed in skits in the Spring Festival Gala in 2012, 2013, 2015, 2018, 2019, 2020, and 2021.

References

External links
Zhang Xiaofei at Douban (in Chinese)

Living people
1986 births
People from Anshan
Chinese women comedians
Chinese film actresses
Chinese television actresses
Actresses from Liaoning
Beijing Film Academy alumni